Edna is the debut studio album by British rapper Headie One. It was released by Relentless Records on 9 October 2020. The album features guest appearances from M Huncho, AJ Tracey, Stormzy, Young T & Bugsey, Young Adz, Future, Drake, Skepta, Ivorian Doll, Kenny Beats, Aitch, Haile, Mahalia, and Kaash Paige. A deluxe version of the album was released on 12 February 2021 which features guest appearances from Rich the Kid, NorthSideBenji, Burna Boy and  RV.

Commercial performance
The album debuted at number one on the UK Albums Chart, selling 15,494 copies in its first week and earning a total of 25.5 million on-demand streams of the album's songs during that week. It also charted in Australia, Belgium, Canada, the Netherlands, Ireland, and Scotland.

Critical reception

Edna was met with critical acclaim. At Metacritic, which assigns a normalised rating out of 100 to reviews from mainstream publications, the album received an average score of 87 based on five reviews. The aggregator AnyDecentMusic? has the critical consensus of the album at a 7.9 out of 10, based on seven reviews.

Track listing

Charts

Certifications

See also
List of UK Albums Chart number ones of the 2020s

References

External links

Headie One albums
2020 debut albums
Albums produced by WondaGurl
Albums produced by Fred Again